Governor Strickland may refer to:

Gerald Strickland, 1st Baron Strickland (1861–1940), Governor of the Leeward Islands, of Tasmania, of Western Australia, and of New South Wales for various periods between 1902 and 1917
Ted Strickland (born 1941), 68th Governor of Ohio from 2007 to 2011